RTR Moldova is a channel that is based in Moldova. It retransmits programmes of Rossiya 1.

Programming
The programmes that the channel have is Vesti-Moldova which is on Mondays to Fridays in Romanian and Russian at 13:00, 16:00 and 20:45, Pyatnitsa S Anatolem Golya is at Fridays at 19:00, Azbuka Vkusa which is on Sundays at 12:00 in Russian and at Mondays to Fridays at 09:00 in Romanian and the ever popular morning show called Dobroe Utro, Strana which in Russian on Mondays to Fridays at 06:00 and in Romanian called Dimineata La RTR which on Fridays at 12:00.

See also
 Rossiya 1
 RTR-Planeta

References

External links

 

Russian-language television stations
Television channels in Moldova
Television channels and stations established in 2013
2013 establishments in Moldova
Mass media in Chișinău